Budino is a sweet Italian dish, usually rich and creamy like a custard or pudding. Like the English word "pudding", "budino" originally referred to a type of medieval sausage. Budino is the Italian word for custard or pudding. It can be thickened with cornstarch or cookies to make it more a soufflé or ganache, and can be sauced with various flavors, including chocolate, caramel, apple, and butterscotch.

References

 Italian desserts